Peter Parada (born July 9, 1973) is an American musician who has been a member of several bands. Parada's drumming career began in 1995 when he joined L.A. band World In Pain on a recommendation from future Korn drummer Ray Luzier and then Steel Prophet in 1996 with whom he recorded one album a year later. Subsequently he joined Face to Face, Saves the Day and The Offspring, where he was a member from 2007 to 2021 and served as the band's second longest-serving drummer, behind Ron Welty. Parada was also associated with the metal band Engine and Rob Halford's solo project Halford, and briefly played drums in the punk band Alkaline Trio. Recently, Parada joined YouTuber Tim Pool's band Timcast for their songs "Only Ever Wanted" and “Genocide” and in 2023 co-founded the band The Defiant.

Career as a musician

Face to Face
After auditioning 25 different drummers to replace Rob Kurth, Parada officially joined Face to Face in 1998. He was present on four albums with the band: Ignorance Is Bliss, Standards & Practices (both released in 1999), Reactionary (2000) and How to Ruin Everything (2002).

Saves the Day
Prior to Face to Face's break up, Parada joined Saves the Day in 2002 to replace former drummer Bryan Newman. He recorded two of the band's albums, In Reverie and Sound the Alarm. He also recorded "Bug sessions volume one", the first in a series of releases containing acoustic versions of their songs. On March 28, 2007, Parada left the band.

The Offspring

On July 27, 2007, The Offspring introduced Parada as the band's new drummer, replacing Atom Willard, who had departed to focus on Angels & Airwaves. Josh Freese filled in as drummer in the studio for then-upcoming Offspring album, Rise and Fall, Rage and Grace, as Parada had not been chosen yet as Willard's replacement. Parada toured with The Offspring in support of that album.

In June 2009, The Offspring guitarist Noodles told Billboard.com that The Offspring were planning to release a ninth album in 2010, and noted that Parada would be involved in the recording process. Titled Days Go By, the album was eventually released on June 26, 2012. He became the first official Offspring drummer to play on an Offspring album since Ron Welty in 2000 (Conspiracy of One). Parada only played on four tracks on that album ("Turning into You", "Dirty Magic", "Dividing by Zero" and "Slim Pickens Does the Right Thing and Rides the Bomb to Hell"), while Josh Freese played on the rest. According to Holland, Freese played on the majority of tracks due to him living in California other than Parada who was also busy with some additional projects during the recording of Days Go By. Parada appeared on ten out of twelve tracks on the band's next album Let the Bad Times Roll (2021).

On August 2, 2021, drummer Pete Parada revealed on Twitter that he was being fired from The Offspring. He stated the reason for his firing was for declining to take a COVID-19 vaccine on the advice of his doctor, due to suffering from Guillain-Barre syndrome. In November 2021, vocalist Dexter Holland and guitarist Kevin Wasserman detailed in an interview the "roadblocks" they kept running into when they looked into what it would take to tour with an unvaccinated member of the band, and they said the decision was taken "for the time being". Nevertheless, in his tweet of August 2021, Parada said he was deemed "unsafe to be around" not only on tour, but also in the recording studio.

The Defiant
In March 2023, Parada co-founded the band The Defiant which is fronted by former Mighty Mighty Bosstones singer Dicky Barrett and features Greg Camp of Smash Mouth, Johnny Rioux of Street Dogs and Joey LaRocca of The Briggs. The group will release their debut album in mid 2023.

Selected discography

References

External links

Pete Parada – BandToBand.com

1973 births
American punk rock drummers
American male drummers
Living people
The Offspring members
People from Steuben County, New York
Face to Face (punk band) members
Jackson United members
Halford (band) members
Engine (American band) members
Alkaline Trio members
20th-century American drummers
21st-century American drummers
Saves the Day members